The domestic pigeon (Columba livia domestica or Columba livia forma domestica) is a pigeon subspecies that was derived from the rock dove (also called the rock pigeon). The rock pigeon is the world's oldest domesticated bird. Mesopotamian cuneiform tablets mention the domestication of pigeons more than 5,000 years ago, as do Egyptian hieroglyphics. Research suggests that domestication of pigeons occurred as early as 10,000 years ago.

Pigeons have made contributions of considerable importance to humanity, especially in times of war. In war the homing ability of pigeons has been put to use by making them messengers. So-called war pigeons have carried many vital messages and some have been decorated for their services. Medals such as the Croix de Guerre, awarded to Cher Ami, and the Dickin Medal awarded to the pigeons G.I. Joe and Paddy, amongst 32 others, have been awarded to pigeons for their services in saving human lives.

Despite this, city pigeons today are seen as pests, mainly due to their droppings. Feral pigeons are considered invasive in many parts of the world, though they have a positive impact on wild bird populations, serving as an important prey species of birds of prey.

Domestication 
Pigeons have served key roles in human society, such as food, pets, holy animals, messengers and in other roles for thousands of years. The earliest recorded mention of pigeons comes from Mesopotamia some 5,000 years ago. Pigeon Valley in Cappadocia has rock formations that were carved into dovecotes, perhaps an example of the earliest man-made structures to house pigeons.

Despite the long history of pigeons, little is known about the specifics of their initial domestication. Which subspecies of C. livia was the progenitor of domestics, exactly when, how many times, where and how they were domesticated, and how they spread, remains unknown. Their fragile bones and similarity to wild birds make the fossil record a poor tool for their study. Thus most of what is known comes from written accounts, which almost certainly do not cover the first stages of domestication. There is strong evidence that some divergences in appearance between the wild-type rock dove and domestic pigeons, such as checkered wing patterns and red/brown coloration, may be due to introgression by cross-breeding with the speckled pigeon.

Ancient Egyptians kept vast quantities of them, and would sacrifice tens of thousands at a time for ritual purposes. Akbar the Great traveled with a coterie of thousands of pigeons. 

As the New World was colonized, the domestic pigeon was brought there as an easy source of food and as swift messengers. Around the 18th century, European interest in fancy pigeons began, and breeders there greatly expanded the variety of pigeons, importing birds from the Middle East and South Asia and mixing different breeds to create new ones.

From a genetic perspective, there are two loose ancestral clades of pigeons, but there is striking genetic homogeneity due to frequent interbreeding and human directed cross-breeding. The first ancestral clade contains pigeons with exaggerated crops, tails, and manes; the second contains tumblers (the most diverse group), homing pigeons, owl pigeons, and those with exaggerated wattles.

Because domestic and feral pigeons have extensively interbred with wild rock doves, wild-type pigeons may not truly exist anymore, or are nearly extinct. This frequent breeding further muddies the true origins of pigeons.

Reproduction

Domestic pigeons reproduce exactly as wild rock pigeons, settling in a safe nook, building a flimsy stick nest, and laying two eggs that are incubated for a little longer than two weeks. Some breeds are so overbred that they may require human intervention to produce squabs successfully. A pigeon keeper may select breeding partners, but in an open loft the birds choose their own mate. Crop milk or pigeon milk produced by both male and female parent birds may occasionally be replaced with artificial substitutes. Pigeons are extremely protective of their eggs and young, and may defend them vigorously from nest predators, which may include their own keepers. Baby pigeons are called squabs, squeakers, or peeps, the latter two in reference to their cry when hungry.

Pigeon breeding

For food

Pigeons bred for meat are generally called squab and harvested from young birds. Pigeons grow to a very large size in the nest before they are fledged and able to fly, and in this stage of their development (when they are called squabs) they are prized as food. For commercial meat production a breed of large white pigeon, the King pigeon, has been developed by selective breeding. Breeds of pigeons developed for their meat are collectively known as utility pigeons.

Homing pigeons

This ability a pigeon has to return home from a strange location necessitates two sorts of information. The first, called "map sense" is their geographic location. The second, "compass sense" is the bearing they need to fly from their new location in order to reach their home. Both of these senses, however, respond to a number of different cues in different situations. The most popular conception of how pigeons are able to do this is that they are able to sense the Earth's magnetic field with tiny magnetic tissues in their head (magnetoception). Another theory is that pigeons have compass sense, which uses the position of the sun, along with an internal clock, to work out direction. However, studies have shown that if magnetic disruption or clock changes disrupt these senses, the pigeon can still manage to get home. The variability in the effects of manipulations to these sense of the pigeons indicates that there is more than one cue on which navigation is based and that map sense appears to rely on a comparison of available cues

A special breed, called homing pigeons, has been developed through selective breeding to carry messages, and members of this variety of pigeon are still being used in the sport of pigeon racing and the white release dove ceremony at weddings and funerals.

Other potential cues used include:
The use of a sun compass
Nocturnal navigation by stars
Visual landmark map
Navigation by infrasound map
Polarised light compass
Olfactory stimuli (see also olfactory navigation)

Exhibition breeds

Pigeon fanciers developed many exotic forms of pigeon. These are generally classed as fancy pigeons. Fanciers compete against each other at exhibitions or shows and the different forms or breeds are judged to a standard to decide who has the best bird. Among those breeds are the English carrier pigeons, a variety of pigeon with wattles and a unique, almost vertical, stance (pictures). There are many ornamental breeds of pigeons, including the "Duchess" breed, which has as a prominent characteristic feet that are completely covered by a sort of fan of feathers. The fantail pigeons are also very ornamental with their fan-shaped tail feathers.

Flying/Sporting

Pigeons are also kept by enthusiasts for the enjoyment of Flying/Sporting competitions. Breeds such as tipplers are flown in endurance contests by their owners.

Experimentation
Domestic pigeons are model organisms; commonly used in laboratory experiments in biology, to test medicines, and in cognitive science.

Cognitive science
Pigeons have been trained to distinguish between cubist and impressionist paintings, for instance. In Project Sea Hunt, a US coast guard search and rescue project in the 1970s/1980s, pigeons were shown to be more effective than humans in spotting shipwreck victims at sea. Research in pigeons is widespread, encompassing shape and texture perception, exemplar and prototype memory, category-based and associative concepts, and many more unlisted here (see pigeon intelligence).

Pigeons are able to acquire orthographic processing skills, which form part of the ability to read, and basic numerical skills equivalent to those shown in primates.

Illegal predator killing by enthusiasts
In the United States, some pigeon keepers illegally trap and kill hawks and falcons to protect their pigeons. In American pigeon-related organizations, some enthusiasts have openly shared their experiences of killing hawks and falcons, although this is frowned upon by the majority of fanciers. None of the major clubs condone this practice. It is estimated that almost 1,000 birds of prey have been killed in Oregon and Washington, and that 1,000–2,000 are killed in southern California annually. In June 2007, three Oregon men were indicted with misdemeanour violations of the Migratory Bird Treaty Act for killing birds of prey. Seven Californians and a Texan were also charged in the case.

In the West Midlands region of the United Kingdom pigeon fanciers have been blamed for a trap campaign to kill peregrine falcons. Eight illegal spring-loaded traps were found close to peregrine nests and at least one of the protected birds died. The steel traps are thought to have been set as part of a "concerted campaign" to kill as many of the birds as possible in the West Midlands.

Pigeon related illness

Pigeon breeders sometimes suffer from an ailment known as bird fancier's lung or pigeon lung. A form of hypersensitivity pneumonitis, pigeon lung is caused by the inhalation of the avian proteins found in feathers and dung. It can sometimes be combated by wearing a filtered mask.
Other pigeon related pathogens causing lung disease are Chlamydophila psittaci (which causes psittacosis), Histoplasma capsulatum (which causes histoplasmosis) and Cryptococcus neoformans, which causes cryptococcosis.

Feral pigeons

Many domestic birds have escaped or been released over the years, and have given rise to the feral pigeon. These show a variety of plumages, although some look very much like pure rock pigeons. The scarcity of the pure wild species is partly due to interbreeding with feral birds. Domestic pigeons can often be distinguished from feral pigeons because they usually have a metal or plastic band around one (sometimes both) legs which shows, by a number on it, that they are registered to an owner.

Feral pigeons bear striking genetic resemblance to homing pigeons, supporting the idea that most feral pigeons trace their origins to homing pigeons who did not find their way home, or were otherwise sired by homing pigeons.

See also
 Doves as symbols
 List of pigeon breeds

References

External links
 National Pigeon Association (USA)
 National Pigeon Association (Great Britain)
 The Canadian Pigeon Fanciers Association
 Domestic Pigeons Explained (Pigeonpedia)
https://pigeoncarecenter.blogspot.com/?m=1

Columba (genus)
Domesticated birds
 
Subspecies
Taxa named by Johann Friedrich Gmelin